Buzz Out Loud, "CNET's podcast of indeterminate length," or BOL, as it is affectionately titled by its fans, was a  podcast about technology produced by CNET. The podcast was released daily on weekdays for the majority of its run, and weekly on Thursdays near its end. At its inception, the show was hosted by Tom Merritt and Molly Wood. Later in the shows life, other hosts (including Veronica Belmont, Brian Tong, and Natali Morris), producers and guests appeared on the show although throughout most of its life, the show had either Tom, Molly or both hosting.

Hosts
The show began with Molly and Tom, producer Veronica Belmont was initially silent but in later episodes spoke as a co-host. Veronica Belmont co-hosted the show until Friday, July 20, 2007 when she left to work at Mahalo.com. Molly Wood was a daily co-host  (with Tom) until Friday, January 16, 2009 when she cut back to once a week. A co-host rotation was instituted and later full-time host Natali Morris (then Natali Del Conte) took full hosting duties alongside Tom. Molly returned as a full-time host on Monday, February 8, 2010.  Tom Merritt left the show (and CNET) on Friday, May 14, 2010 to host Tech News Today on TWiT. Brian Tong became a full-time host until the end of the show's life.

History

During the show's public debut on March 30, 2005, it promised to deliver "5 or so" minutes of Tom & Molly's take on tech news every second day, but it evolved into 35–45 minutes of daily tech-related banter and commentary. As early as 30 March 2005, Molly and Tom were discussing subjects such as: patent infringement lawsuits, the Apple iPod, and DRM. In 2006, they produced a video episode of Buzz Out Loud at the San Francisco premiere of Snakes on a Plane. At CES 2007, video of the Buzz Out Loud podcast recording sessions were streamed live on CNET TV. On 21 May 2007, Jason Howell joined the podcast as producer.

"Buzztown" is a fictional city in which the listeners of Buzz Out Loud are the residents, and is similar to a real city in that it has a mayor. Listeners are also referred to as "The Buzz Brigade" or "The Buzz Militia".

The show was used as an example in an O'Reilly article on how to rewrite a podgrabber.

Buzz Out Loud was named in Apple's iTunes Best of 2008 under 'Classic Audio Podcasts.'.

On Thursday, June 18, 2009, Buzz Out Loud celebrated its 1,000th episode with a live video celebration, featuring a brief news segment, then moving to the CNET video studio for an hour-long celebration live streamed for Buzz Out Loud'''s 1,000th episode. The special was hosted by Tom Merritt, Molly Wood, Natali Morris (formerly Natali Del Conte), Jason Howell, Veronica Belmont, Leo Laporte, Brian Tong, Brian Cooley, Rafe Needleman, and other community members.

On Friday, April 16, 2010, Tom Merritt announced that he would be leaving CNET to join the TWiT Network as a daily host. A few months later, on September 7, TWIT's Leo Laporte announced on the TWIT-blog that Jason Howell would broadcast his last Buzz Out Loud on Friday, September 24, 2010, to join TWiT the following Monday.

On Thursday, September 1, 2011, Molly Wood announced that the show would go weekly starting the 22nd of the month, as part of a major reshuffle of CNET Live's schedule with new shows to be announced later. The first week of the new format, however, saw the broadcast of several editions: a Bonus Makeup Monday Show was broadcast on the 26th; then a couple of days later on Wednesday, live coverage of the Amazon Kindle Press Event; and finally on the Thursday, the first weekly show proper. The second week of the new format also saw multiple editions: on Tuesday, October 4, 2011, "iPhone Not-Five" covered an Apple product launch event, and the next day a special edition reacted to the unexpected announcement of the death of Apple co-founder, Steve Jobs, with listener reactions to Jobs' death being a major topic in the regular edition that followed later that week.

On Friday, March 23, 2012, it was announced that the podcast would cease production, with its last broadcast being on Thursday, April 5, 2012, ending a seven-year run. The final show, episode 1588, titled "Loved the Show" (a reference to the end words or signing off, of most BOL letters read on air, which was "Love the show"). The episode brought together the current hosts and producer, Molly Wood, Brian Tong and Stephen Beacham, as well as original hosts, co-hosts and friends, including Tom Merritt, Veronica Belmont, Jason Howell, Rafe Needleman, Natali Morris and Donald Bell.

In March 2015, Merritt, Wood, Howell, and Belmont reunited for a 10-year anniversary episode of the podcast.

Format
All episodes have live streaming video and live chat available on CNET Live. Episodes are usually posted via the BOL blog and RSS feeds by 12 noon Pacific. Listeners to the show are encouraged to submit their comments by email or by telephone, as well as to post to the Buzz Out Loud Forums. Most aired comments are included in the show's e-mail newsletter, which is available from the show's home page.

In November 2005, the show gained Earthlink as a sponsor. This marked the beginning of a period of continuity for the show, as most episodes have featured the trio of commentators. The exceptions usually involve one of the commentators being unavailable to record due to business trips, sick days, or vacations. In late March 2006, Buzz Out Loud switched to a new Earthlink sponsorship, having 11 different ads instead of the previous 1. Earthlink eventually ended their sponsorship at the beginning of 2008, and the program went unsponsored for five months. On May 1, Best Buy became the sponsor of the program, featuring a similar ad pattern as Earthlink.

The show occasionally features interviews; initially, these were integrated as a part of the show, but they have since been spun off into separate episodes due to listener requests. Technology innovators including Lawrence Lessig and Steve Wozniak have been interviewed, as well as several hosts of the TWiT.tv and Revision3 networks.

Every so often, the Buzz Out Loud crew records live shows at technology trade shows, such as recordings done from the Consumer Electronics Show (CES), and Macworld. These live shows can include a live audience, made up of fans of the show, and discussions on the different products that the commentators have seen at the shows. Other times, one of the hosts will attend a live event, such as Molly at the former E3, and instead call in to the show before, during or after the event with updated information.

A video edition of the podcast had been experimented on and off with several services, until the Friday-only video edition within a dedicated studio was launched officially on CNET TV with the May 2 episode. As of Episode 797, this version has been abandoned in favor of a recorded version of the USTREAM video. The Buzz Out Loud'' Podcast now has a video version, and an audio version of the show available every day at bol.cnet.com

Guest hosts
Guest hosts originally appeared on the podcast only when either Tom or Molly were unable to be in the studio. These included producer Jason Howell prior to becoming a full-time host, Webware.com editor Rafe Needleman, automotive reviewer Brian Cooley, and News.com reporters Caroline McCarthy and Erica Ogg.

After many listener suggestions, they decided to have four hosts for each show, alternating guest hosts each day. Frequent guests included Natali Del Conte, Brian Tong, Brian Cooley, and Rafe Needleman. At the start of 2009, Molly Wood announced that she would become one of the guest hosts while Natali would become a permanent member of the round-table. Natali has decided to step back from being permanent since the 1000th episode making Tom Merritt a permanent member. Wood returned as a permanent host in winter 2009.

On 19 December 2007 and 20 December 2007, two special guest-host editions were produced where listeners were called and asked to participate in the special episodes.

References

External links

CNET Podcast Central

Buzz Out Loud Show Page

Show Archive from Odeo
BOL 2010 Music Theme by 
Buzz Town Center

CNET
Audio podcasts
2005 podcast debuts
2012 podcast endings
Technology podcasts
News podcasts
American podcasts